Pravin Vijay Tambe (born 8 October 1971) is an Indian cricketer. Tambe made his Indian Premier League debut at the age of 41, becoming the oldest ever IPL debutant. He had no experience playing professional cricket prior his IPL debut.

Personal life 
He is married to Vaishali Tambe. Together the couple has a son named Pranav Tambe and a daughter named Pari Tambe.

Early career 
When Pravin was young, he wanted to be a fast bowler but it was his Orient Shipping captain Ajay Kadam who asked him to bowl as a leg spinner.

He had toiled for several years as a club level cricketer in Mumbai which he pursued as a side hustle while also holding down a day job. He started playing club cricket in the 1995–96 season with the Parsee Cyclists side in the D division of the Mumbai's domestic league. He then later switched to Parsee Gymkhana in the B division of the Mumbai's domestic league before leapfrogging to play in the top league when he joined the Shivaji Park Gymkhana. He was named in the Mumbai Ranji probables squad in between 2000 and 2002 but was not drafted in the final squad.

Indian Premier League
Pravin had an unusual career for a cricketer as he had never played First-class cricket but was picked for the Indian Premier League. Rahul Dravid, his chief mentor at  Royals had said that Praveen Tambe is an even bigger inspiration than himself. During the early seasons of the IPL (in the first five seasons from 2008 to 2012), he worked as a liaison officer for about five years especially whenever matches were conducted at the DY Patil Stadium in Navi Mumbai.

He received an IPL contract with Rajasthan Royals after being spotted by scouts during an invitational T20 tournament where he was noticed for his ability to bowl great variations of leg spin. It was initially revealed that Tambe was the coach of the B team of the DY Patil Sports Academy in their invitational T20 tournament which was held in January 2013. However, he had to step in as the first-choice bowler in place of injured Rahul Sharma and Tambe stepped up by taking 12 wickets which helped his side to win the invitational tournament. It was this performance in the invitational tournament that caught attention and helped him get an IPL contract with Rajasthan Royals. He made his professional cricket debut as well as his T20 debut playing for Rajasthan Royals against Delhi Daredevils in the 2013 Indian Premier League at the age of 41.

Former club-mate and Mumbai selector Abey Kuruvilla also revealed that Pravin has only peaked over the last 8 years, ever since he switched from bowling medium pace to leg spin. During the 2014 Indian Premier League, Pravin took a hat-trick against Kolkata Knight Riders on 5 May 2014 in Ahmedabad by dismissing Manish Pandey, Yusuf Pathan and Ryan ten Doeschate which also helped him to earn the man of the match award. He briefly held the purple cap in IPL 2014 up till the 25th match of the tournament. He ended 2014 IPL season on a high by taking 15 wickets (he was also the leading wicket taker for Rajasthan Royals in 2014 season) although Rajasthan Royals couldn't progress to playoffs after a disastrous loss to Mumbai Indians.

In 2016, he was bought by the Gujarat Lions franchise for the 2016 Indian Premier League season. In February 2017, Pravin was bought by the Sunrisers Hyderabad team for the 2017 Indian Premier League for 10 lakhs. In the 2020 IPL auction, he was bought by the Kolkata Knight Riders ahead of the 2020 Indian Premier League. He withdrew his initial retirement decision which he made in 2018 in order to return to IPL in 2020 after being bought by KKR for 20 lakhs in the 2019 auction. However, he was disqualified by the IPL governing body to take part in 2020 IPL after playing in a T10 league without getting proper permission from relevant authorities and for breaching BCCI's policies.

T10 Cricket League
In season two of the Abu Dhabi T10 League season, Pravin played for the Sindhis team. He initially announced his retirement in 2018 in order to play in the T10 league as the BCCI's rule strictly says an active Indian cricketer cannot play in a foreign league. In the fourth group phase match of the 2018 T10 League against Kerala Knights, he set a record by becoming the first player to take a 5 wicket haul in the history of T10 format when he dismissed Chris Gayle, Eoin Morgan, Kieron Pollard, Fabian Allen and Upul Tharanga. In the same match, he coincidentally completed a hat-trick by dismissing Morgan, Pollard and Allen on consecutive balls. He also became the second player after Shahid Afridi to take a hat-trick in T10 league.

Domestic and T20 franchise career
He received the Golden Wicket award (for taking most wickets in the tournament) in 2013 Champions League Twenty20. He ended up taking 12 wickets in five matches with an impressive average of 6.50 which was even far better than the likes of Ravichandran Ashwin and Sunil Narine. He was also the most economical bowler for the Royals in the 2013 CLT20 final against the Mumbai Indians where he delivered a crucial spell of 2/19 in 4 overs.

Pravin received his maiden call for Mumbai cricket team squad in 2013–14 Ranji Trophy and made his debut in the next round against Orissa cricket team. He made his List A debut for Mumbai in the 2016–17 Vijay Hazare Trophy on 25 February 2017.

In July 2020, Pravin was named in the Trinbago Knight Riders squad for the 2020 Caribbean Premier League (CPL). He became the first Indian cricketer to get a contract in the CPL. On 26 August 2020, he played in the match between Trinbago Knight Riders and the St Lucia Zouks, to become the first ever Indian cricketer to play in the CPL. He had to retire again from Indian cricket in order to take part in the 2020 CPL after he initially withdrew his retirement when he intended to play in 2020 IPL.

Popular culture
A biopic based on his life titled 'Kaun Pravin Tambe?' starring Shreyas Talpade was released on 1 April 2022 on Disney+ Hotstar.

Net Worth 
Indian cricketer and successful businessman Pravin Tambe has built up an impressive net worth over the course of his career. As per our estimation, Pravin Tambe net worth will be around $750,000, or INR 6 crore.

References

External links 

Pravin Tambe's Biopic at Cricket and Cricketer

1971 births
Living people
Indian cricketers
Mumbai cricketers
Sunrisers Hyderabad cricketers
Rajasthan Royals cricketers
Gujarat Lions cricketers
Cricketers from Mumbai